This is a list of albums attributed to the Japanese animated and video game adaptations of A Certain Scientific Railgun manga series written by Kazuma Kamachi and illustrated by Motoi Fuyukawa.

Singles

Anime

Opening theme

Ending theme

Video game

Soundtracks

Spark!! (A Certain Scientific Railgun Official Soundtrack 1)

Spark!! (A Certain Scientific Railgun Original Soundtrack 1) is the first soundtrack for the first season of A Certain Scientific Railgun, which was released by Geneon Universal Entertainment on January 29, 2010.

Track listing

Moment (A Certain Scientific Railgun Original Soundtrack 2)

Moment (A Certain Scientific Railgun Original Soundtrack 2) is the second soundtrack for the first season of A Certain Scientific Railgun, which was released by Geneon Universal Entertainment on May 28, 2010.

Track listing

A Certain Scientific Railgun S Original Soundtrack Vol. 1

A Certain Scientific Railgun S Original Soundtrack Vol. 1 is the first soundtrack for A Certain Scientific Railgun S, which is bundled in the series' first limited edition Blu-ray and DVD volumes that were released by Warner Home Video on July 24, 2013.

Track listing

A Certain Scientific Railgun S Original Soundtrack Vol. 2

A Certain Scientific Railgun S Original Soundtrack Vol. 2 is the second soundtrack for A Certain Scientific Railgun S, which is bundled in the series' fifth limited edition Blu-ray and DVD volumes that were released by Warner Home Video on November 27, 2013.

Track listing

A Certain Scientific Railgun T Original Soundtrack

A Certain Scientific Railgun T Original Soundtrack is the soundtrack for A Certain Scientific Railgun T, which is bundled in the series' fifth limited edition Blu-ray and DVD volumes that were released by Warner Bros. Home Entertainment on October 9, 2020.

Track listing

References

Anime soundtracks
Discographies of Japanese artists
Film and television discographies